The 1932 Kansas State Wildcats football team represented Kansas State University in the 1932 college football season.  The 1932 team finished 4–4 overall and they finished in fourth place in the Big Six Conference with a 2–3 conference record. The Kansas State team was led by future Hall-of-Fame coach Bo McMillin in his fifth season. The Wildcats played their home games in Memorial Stadium.  The Wildcats scored 160 points and gave up 80 points.

Schedule

References

Kansas State
Kansas State Wildcats football seasons
Kansas State Wildcats football